Tier 1 capital is the core measure of a bank's financial strength from a regulator's point of view. It is composed of core capital, which consists primarily of common stock and disclosed reserves (or retained earnings), but may also include non-redeemable non-cumulative preferred stock. The Basel Committee also observed that banks have used innovative instruments over the years to generate Tier 1 capital; these are subject to stringent conditions and are limited to a maximum of 15% of total Tier 1 capital. This part of the Tier 1 capital will be phased out during the implementation of Basel III.

Capital in this sense is related to, but different from, the accounting concept of shareholders' equity. Both Tier 1 and Tier 2 capital were first defined in the Basel I capital accord and remained substantially the same in the replacement Basel II accord. Tier 2 capital represents "supplementary capital" such as undisclosed reserves, revaluation reserves, general loan-loss reserves, hybrid (debt/equity) capital instruments, and subordinated debt.

Each country's banking regulator, however, has some discretion over how differing financial instruments may count in a capital calculation, because the legal framework varies in different legal systems.

The theoretical reason for holding capital is that it should provide protection against unexpected losses. This is not the same as expected losses, which are covered by provisions, reserves and current year profits. In Basel I agreement, Tier 1 capital is a minimum of % ownership equity but investors generally require a ratio of 10%. Tier 1 capital should be greater than % of the minimum requirement.

Tier 1 capital ratio 

The Tier 1 capital ratio is the ratio of a bank's core equity capital to its total risk-weighted assets (RWA). Risk-weighted assets are the total of all assets held by the bank weighted by credit risk according to a formula determined by the Regulator (usually the country's central bank). Most central banks follow the Basel Committee on Banking Supervision (BCBS) guidelines in setting formulae for asset risk weights. Assets like cash and currency usually have zero risk weight, while certain loans have a risk weight at 100% of their face value. The BCBS is a part of the Bank of International Settlements (BIS). Under BCBS guidelines total RWA is not limited to Credit Risk. It contains components for Market Risk (typically based on value at risk (VAR) ) and Operational Risk. The BCBS rules for calculation of the components of total RWA have seen a number of changes following the Financial crisis of 2007–08.

As an example, assume a bank with $2 of equity lends out $10 to a client. Assuming that the loan, now a $10 asset on the bank's balance sheet, carries a risk weighting of 90%, the bank now holds risk-weighted assets of $9 ($10 × 90%). Using the original equity of $2, the bank's Tier 1 ratio is calculated to be $2/$9 or 22%.

There are two conventions for calculating and quoting the Tier 1 capital ratio:

 Tier 1 common capital ratio and
 Tier 1 total capital ratio

Preferred shares and non-controlling interests are included in the Tier 1 total capital ratio but not the Tier 1 common ratio. As a result, the common ratio will always be less than or equal to the total capital ratio. In the example above, the two ratios are the same.

See also 

 Bank for International Settlements
 Bank stress tests
 Basel Accords
 Basel Committee on Banking Supervision
 Capital requirement and reserve requirement
 Contingent convertible bond
 Tier 2 capital

Notes

References

External links 
 Bank for International Settlements

Capital requirement